Fernand Bourgaux (born 25 December 1919) was a Belgian sprinter. He competed in the men's 200 metres at the 1948 Summer Olympics.

References

External links

1919 births
Possibly living people
Athletes (track and field) at the 1948 Summer Olympics
Belgian male sprinters
Olympic athletes of Belgium